Aa Bb Kk is a Marathi feature film written by Aba Gaikwad and directed by Ramkumar Shedge and produced by Meehir Kulkarni. The film is based on social subject.

Plot 
A tragic tale of a girl Jani, who is branded as a curse by the society after her mother dies while giving birth. The film revolves around the hardships she and her brother Hari face in their day-to-day life.

Cast 
 Baby Mythili Patwardhan as Jani
 Nawazuddin Siddiqui
 Master Sunny Pawar as Margya
 Master Sahil joshi as Hari
 Vijay Patkar as Peon
 Ravi Kishan
 Tanvi Sinha
 Divya Shetty
 Tamannaah (cameo) as Tamannaji
 Suniel Shetty as Bapa  (cameo)

Reception 
The Times of India rated the film 3 out of 5 stars. Film was successful at the box office.

Music

References

External links 
 

2010s Marathi-language films
2018 films
Indian drama films
2018 drama films